Paul Regan Adams (born 20 January 1977) is a former South African cricketer. A left-arm unorthodox spin bowler with a unique bowling action, Adams played for the Test and ODI teams for national team sporadically since the 1990s. Meanwhile, his first class cricket career registered 412 wickets. He was also the coach of the Cape Cobras cricket team.

Bowling action
Adams's bowling action was highly unorthodox and Mike Gatting likened it to a "frog in a blender". Though his action initially caught world batsmen by surprise, he was soon exposed for lack of variety by the Australians. As such, he became less effective.

International career
In December 2006 he was recalled to the Test side for the series against India, only to be dropped from the squad before the first Test. He held the ball with two fingers of his left hand (thumb, and the index finger).  He announced his retirement from professional cricket on 2 October 2008, more than four years after his last Test match and five years after his last ODI.

Notes

External links

1977 births
Living people
Cape Cobras cricketers
Cape Coloureds
Commonwealth Games gold medallists for South Africa
Cricketers at the 1996 Cricket World Cup
Cricketers at the 1998 Commonwealth Games
South Africa One Day International cricketers
South Africa Test cricketers
South African cricketers
Western Province cricketers
Cricketers from Cape Town
South African cricket coaches
Commonwealth Games medallists in cricket
Medallists at the 1998 Commonwealth Games